Junior lieutenant is a junior officer rank in several countries, equivalent to Sub-lieutenant.

Germany

Eastern Europe
In many Eastern European countries, the rank of junior lieutenant is used.

Russia
The rank of Junior lieutenant was introduced into the Russian military in 1937.

Junior lieutenant insignia

Army insignia

See also
 Podporuchik

References

Military ranks